The Curtiss-Wright CW-3 Duckling (sometimes called the Teal) was an American two-seat amphibian flying-boat developed by Curtiss-Wright from the CW-1 Junior.

Development
The Duckling was a modification of the CW-1 Junior. The fuselage had a plywood V-shaped underside added and the addition of strut-mounted pontoons. The engine was mounted above the wing driving a pusher propeller. Only three aircraft were built, all powered by different engines. The type was not developed due to lack of funds.

Variants
CW-3
Prototype powered by a 90hp (67kW) Velie M-5 radial engine, one built.
CW-3L
Variant powered by a 90hp (67kW) Lambert radial engine, one built.
CW-3W
Variant powered by a 90hp (67kW) Warner Scarab radial engine, one built.

Specifications (CL-3W)

See also

References

Citations

Bibliography

Flying boats
Duckling
1930s United States civil utility aircraft
Single-engined pusher aircraft
Parasol-wing aircraft
Amphibious aircraft
Aircraft first flown in 1931